Lotte Bundsgaard (born 20 January 1973) is a Danish schoolteacher, journalist and politician.

She was born in Nivå to Jørgen Bundsgaard and Hanne Lund Bundsgaard. She married Søren Thorsager in 1999. She was elected member of Folketinget for the Social Democrats from 1998 to 2007. She was Minister for Towns and Homes and Minister for Equal Rights in Poul Nyrup Rasmussen's fourth cabinet from December 2000 to November 2001.

Bundsgaard was educated schoolteacher at Odense Seminarium and worked as schoolteacher before she was elected to Folketinget.

References

1973 births
Living people
People from Fredensborg Municipality
Government ministers of Denmark
Social Democrats (Denmark) politicians
21st-century Danish politicians
21st-century Danish women politicians
Women government ministers of Denmark
Danish schoolteachers
University of Southern Denmark alumni
21st-century Danish journalists